Fenix TX (typeset as Fenix*TX) is the first of three albums Fenix TX released after their name change. It was issued on July 13, 1999, by MCA and Drive-Thru Records.

Most of the Riverfenix was re-recorded for Fenix TX. "Skinhead Jessie", "Jaw" and the untitled tracks from Riverfenix weren't included on this album, instead they were replaced by the previously unreleased "Flight 601 (All I've Got Is Time)" and "Surf Song". The track listing had also been rearranged.

Cleveland.com ranked "All My Fault" at number 91 on their list of the top 100 pop-punk songs.

Track listing
(all songs written by Fenix TX)
"Flight 601 (All I've Got Is Time)" – 3:28
"Minimum Wage" – 2:02
"Surf Song" – 2:37
"All My Fault" – 2:49
"Jolly Green Dumbass" – 2:51
"G.B.O.H." – 3:25
"Ben" – 3:27
"Speechless" – 4:13
"Philosophy" – 2:18
"No Lie" – 2:38
"Apple Pie Cowboy Toothpaste" – 4:50
"Jean Claude Trans Am" – 2:37
"Rooster Song" – 2:30

Personnel
Fenix TX
 Will Salazar (credited as Will Powers) – guitar, lead vocals
 Damon DeLaPaz (credited as Dumpster Damon) – guitar, background vocals
 Adam Lewis (credited as Adam Atomic) – bass
 Donnie Reyes (credited as Donnie Vomit) – drums

References 

1999 albums
Fenix TX albums
Drive-Thru Records albums
Albums produced by Jerry Finn
Albums produced by Ryan Greene